Zaherite is a mineral, a complex sulfate of aluminium, formula Al12(OH)26(SO4)5·20H2O. It was discovered in the Salt range, Punjab, Pakistan by M. A. Zaher of the Bangladesh Geological Survey after whom it is named in 1977. This mineral would be extremely soluble in water and unlikely to persist anywhere except in the most arid of environments.  It spontaneously, and reversibly dehydrates around room temperature. Its color is white to blue-green.

See also
List of minerals
List of minerals named after people

References

Webmineral data

Aluminium minerals
Sulfate minerals
Triclinic minerals